Tori Welles (born June 17, 1967) is an American former pornographic actress.

Early life
Welles was born and raised in Southern California. She is of Spanish, French, Norwegian, and English descent.

Career

Welles performed in adult films between 1988 and 1999 and also directed several movies in the early 1990s. In 1997 Paul Norman released a private home video of himself and Welles, filmed after their divorce, called The Private Diary of Tori Welles. Welles was reportedly angry but said she had no legal basis to stop its distribution.

Welles is a former contract performer with Vivid Entertainment. She has also worked for production companies such as Caballero Home Video, Evil Angel, VCA Pictures, and the Zane Entertainment Group.

Welles is also the host of an internet radio show for Vivid radio.

Appearances
Welles has appeared in a variety of minor mainstream acting roles such as the 1995 Clint Howard horror-comedy Ice Cream Man (credited as Brittania Paris) and a 2006 episode of the comedy series Scrubs. She was also featured in 1993 on the Swedish late night talk show Adam. Welles also has director, producer, costume & wardrobe, and writing credits.

Other ventures
In 1998, in partnership with Erostar, Welles released a sex toy molded from her genitalia.

As of 2004 she worked as a regional sales manager for Peach DVD, under the name Brittania Paris. In May 2011, Welles was hired as a sales associate by Metro Entertainment.

In March 2012, Welles and Tom Byron launched Hall of Fame Management, a talent agency that represents pornographic actors, directors, editors, photographers, and other adult industry workers. She also has her own production company called Tori Welles Entertainment.

Personal life
She was married to adult film producer Paul Norman.

Awards

References

External links 

 
 
 

1967 births
American people of English descent
American people of French descent
American people of Norwegian descent
American people of Spanish descent
American pornographic film actresses
American pornographic film directors
American talent agents
Hispanic and Latino American pornographic film actors
Living people
People from the San Fernando Valley
Pornographic film actors from California
Women pornographic film directors
Film directors from Los Angeles
21st-century American women